Brenna is a comune (municipality) in the Province of Como in the Italian region Lombardy, located about  north of Milan and about  southeast of Como.

Brenna borders the following municipalities: Alzate Brianza, Cantù, Carugo, Inverigo, Mariano Comense.

Demographic evolution

Twin towns — sister cities
Brenna is twinned with:

  Láchar, Spain

References

External links
 www.comune.brenna.co.it/

Cities and towns in Lombardy